The Ney Nature Center is a  nature center and county park in Le Sueur County in the U.S. state of Minnesota. The park is named after the Ney family, who originally lived where the park is. The park is located on a bluff overlooking the Minnesota River Valley near Henderson Station.

The park is located along MN State Highway 19, just west of U.S. 169.

Activities 
Activities at the Ney Nature Center include hiking, mountain biking, cross-country skiing, snowshoeing, geocaching, maple-syrup making, and educational programs.

See also 
List of nature centers in Minnesota

External links 
Ney Nature Center Website
Le Sueur County Parks Department

References

Parks in Minnesota
Nature centers in Minnesota
Protected areas of Le Sueur County, Minnesota
Buildings and structures in Le Sueur County, Minnesota
Education in Le Sueur County, Minnesota
Tourist attractions in Le Sueur County, Minnesota
Protected areas established in 1990
1990 establishments in Minnesota